Midnight Menace is a 1937 British thriller film directed by Sinclair Hill and starring Charles Farrell, Margaret Vyner, Fritz Kortner and Danny Green. The screenplay concerns an international arms manufacturing firm's plans to start a war in Europe by bombing London. It was released in the United States as Bombs Over London.

Production
The film was made at Pinewood Studios. Its original script was written by Alexander Mackendrick. The film's sets were designed by Wilfred Arnold.

Cast
 Charles Farrell as Brian Gaunt
 Margaret Vyner as Mary Stevens
 Fritz Kortner as Peters
 Danny Green as Socks
 Wallace Evennett as Smith
 Monti DeLyle as Pierre
 Dino Galvani as Tony
 Arthur Finn as Mac, Newspaper Editor 
 Laurence Hanray as Sir George, Lead Conspirator 
 Arthur Gomez as Baron von Kleisch, Delegate 
 Raymond Lovell as Harris
 Evan John as Doctor Marsh 
 Reynes Barton as Conference President 
 Terence O'Brien as Secret Agent Fearns 
 Dennis Val Norton as Vronsky, Peters' Aide
 Billy Bray as Banks  
 Sydney King as Graham Stevens 
 Andreas Malandrinos as Zadek 
 Victor Tandy as Groves

References

Bibliography
 Low, Rachael. Filmmaking in 1930s Britain. George Allen & Unwin, 1985.
 Wood, Linda. British Films, 1927–1939. British Film Institute, 1986.

External links

1937 films
1930s thriller films
British thriller films
Films shot at Pinewood Studios
Films set in London
British black-and-white films
Films directed by Sinclair Hill
1930s English-language films
1930s British films